Academy Street School is a historic school complex located at Salem, Virginia. The complex consists of two buildings; the first built in 1890 and the annex about 1903. They are connected by a hyphen.  The 1890 building is a two-story, three bay, brick building with a projecting three-story tower and hipped roof.  The 1903 annex building is a two-story, "L"-shaped brick building with a hipped roof and one-story frame porch.

The church was added to the National Register of Historic Places in 1981.

References

School buildings on the National Register of Historic Places in Virginia
School buildings completed in 1891
Schools in Salem, Virginia
National Register of Historic Places in Salem, Virginia